Kateryna Karmanenko (born 3 September 1986) is a Ukrainian long-distance runner. She competed in the marathon event at the 2015 World Championships in Athletics in Beijing, China.

References

External links

1986 births
Living people
Ukrainian female long-distance runners
Ukrainian female marathon runners
World Athletics Championships athletes for Ukraine
Place of birth missing (living people)